Darreh Tang may refer to:
 Darreh Tang, Shahr-e Babak, Kerman Province
 Darreh Tang, Lorestan
 Darreh Tang-e Olya, Lorestan Province
 Darreh Tang-e Sofla, Lorestan Province